Petr Šíma (born 25 February 1983 in Domažlice) is a former Czech football defender.

Šíma played for the Czech Republic at the 2003 FIFA World Youth Championship in the United Arab Emirates.

References

External links
 
 
 Player profile 

1983 births
Living people
People from Domažlice
Czech footballers
Czech Republic under-21 international footballers
Czech Republic youth international footballers
Association football defenders
Czech First League players
FC Viktoria Plzeň players
FK Chmel Blšany players
SK Dynamo České Budějovice players
FC Zbrojovka Brno players
FK Baník Sokolov players
Slovak Super Liga players
FK Senica players
Expatriate footballers in Slovakia
Czech expatriate sportspeople in Slovakia
Sportspeople from the Plzeň Region